TGM5 is a transglutaminase enzyme.

TGM5 encodes one member of the multigene transglutaminase family. Transglutaminases (TGs) are involved in protein cross-linking by catalyzing the formation of gamma-glutamyl-lysine isodipeptide bonds between adjacent polypeptides (Candi et al. 2005; Eckert et al. 2005). This process is particularly important in the terminal differentiation of the epidermis, where TGs heavily cross-link keratins and a range of differentiation-specific structural proteins, such as involucrin, loricrin, filaggrin, and small proline-rich proteins, in the formation of the cornified cell envelope in the biogenesis of the stratum corneum, the outermost, “dead” layer of the epidermis (Kalinin et al. 2002). This continuously shed outer layer of the epidermis performs the main barrier function of the skin. Recessive loss-of-function mutations in TGM1 have been shown to cause lamellar ichthyosis, a disease characterized by excessive scaling and shedding of the outer epidermis (Huber et al. 1995; Parmentier et al. 1995; Russell et al. 1995).

Clinical significance 

TGM5 mutations can cause acral peeling skin syndrome, an autosomal recessive genodermatosis characterized by the shedding of the outer epidermis. In the acral form, the dorsa of the hands and feet are predominantly affected. Ultrastructural analysis has revealed tissue separation at the junction between the granular cells and the stratum corneum in the outer epidermis. Genomewide linkage analysis in a consanguineous Dutch kindred mapped the gene to 15q15.2 in the interval between markers D15S1040 and D15S1016. Two homozygous missense mutations, T109M and G113C, were found in TGM5, which encodes transglutaminase 5 (TG5), in all affected persons in two unrelated families. The mutation was present on the same haplotype in both kindreds, indicating a probable ancestral mutation. TG5 is strongly expressed in the epidermal granular cells, where it cross-links a variety of structural proteins in the terminal differentiation of the epidermis to form the cornified cell envelope. An established, in vitro, biochemical cross-linking assay revealed that, although T109M is not pathogenic, G113C completely abolishes TG5 activity. Three-dimensional modeling of TG5 showed that G113C lies close to the catalytic domain, and, furthermore, that this glycine residue is conserved in all known transglutaminases, which is consistent with pathogenicity. Other families with more-widespread peeling skin phenotypes lacked TGM5 mutations. This study identifies the first causative gene in this heterogeneous group of skin disorders and demonstrates that the protein cross-linking function performed by TG5 is vital for maintaining cell-cell adhesion between the outermost layers of the epidermis.

References